Damonte Dodd (born May 10, 1994) is an American professional basketball player for KB Vëllaznimi of the Kosovo Basketball Superleague. Dodd played college basketball at Maryland from 2013 to 2017.  Dodd ranks number eight on their all-time blocks list.

He grew up in Centreville, Maryland, raised by Angela and Michael Anderson, where he attended Queen Anne's County High School.  Before going to the University of Maryland, he went to Massanutten Academy because he “needed to polish his academics and basketball skills.”

After graduating, he played for the Northern Arizona Suns of the NBA G League. Dodd signed with the Polish club GTK Gliwice on August 5, 2018.

Dodd began the 2021–22 season with BK Děčín of the Czech league and averaged 8.9 points, 7.1 rebounds, 1.1 assists and 1.2 blocks per game. On November 21, he returned to GTK Gliwice.

References

1994 births
Living people
American expatriate basketball people in the Czech Republic
American expatriate basketball people in Mexico
American expatriate basketball people in Poland
American men's basketball players
Basketball players from Maryland
Centers (basketball)
GTK Gliwice players
Maryland Terrapins men's basketball players
Northern Arizona Suns players
People from Centreville, Maryland
Sportspeople from the Baltimore metropolitan area